Year 961 (CMLXI) was a common year starting on Tuesday (link will display the full calendar) of the Julian calendar.

Events 
 By place 

 Byzantine Empire 
 March 6 – Siege of Chandax: Byzantine forces under Nikephoros II Phokas capture and pillage Chandax after an 8-month siege. Nikephoros massacres the population without mercy and carries them off into slavery, returning to Constantinople with Emir Abd al-Aziz ibn Shu'ayb and his family as prisoners. The island Emirate of Crete is converted into a Byzantine theme and the remaining Muslims are converted to Christianity.

 Europe 
 May 26 – Otto I, Holy Roman Emperor elects his 6-year-old son Otto II as heir apparent and co-ruler at the Imperial Diet in Worms. He is crowned at Aachen, and placed under the tutelage of his grandmother Matilda and his half-brother William of Mainz. Otto's own brother Bruno I is charged with the provisional government of Lorraine again. 
 Summer – Otto I leads an expeditionary force into northern Italy through the Brenner Pass at Trento, to assist the beleaguered young Pope John XII. He proceeds towards Pavia – King Berengar II sends his son and co-ruler Adalbert II from Rome at the head of a large army to seize control of the Upper Adige and contest Otto's entry. 
 October 15 – Caliph Abd-al-Rahman III dies after a 32-year reign. He is succeeded by his son Al-Hakam II as ruler of the Caliphate of Córdoba in Al-Andalus (modern Spain).
 Battle of Fitjar – A Viking force under the sons of Eric Bloodaxe lands on Hordaland. King Haakon the Good defeats the rebelling force, but is killed. Harald Greycloak becomes ruler of the western part of Norway.
 The Lombard army under Adalbert II refuses to fight Otto I unless Berengar II abdicates in favor of Adalbert. Berengar refuses, and the armies retreat to their strongholds. Berengar and his family take whatever loyal soldiers remain and disperse themselves – Berengar retreats to the fortress at Montefeltro (in the Pentapolis).

 Armenia 
 King Ashot III of Armenia (the Merciful) moves his capital from Kars eastward to Ani (modern Turkey). Located on a major east-west caravan route, Ani will become larger than any European city, with a population of about 100,000 that will rival Baghdad, Cairo, and Constantinople. Ani also becomes the site of the royal mausoleum of the Bagratuni kings.

 By topic 

 Art 
 The "Shroud of Saint Josse", a rich silk Samite camel cloth from Khurasan, is made. It is preserved in the Abbey of Saint-Josse-sur-Mer, near Caen (Normandy) (approximate date).

 Religion 
 The Tiger Hill Pagoda (or Huqui Tower) is built in the city of Suzhou, located in Jiangsu Province  (Eastern China).
 Tavistock Abbey is founded by Ordgar, Ealdorman of Devon, in England.

Births 
 January 15 – Seongjong, ruler of Goryeo (Korea) (d. 997)
 Al-Tha'alibi, Persian historian and writer (d. 1038)
 Arnulf II, Count of Flanders (the Younger), Frankish nobleman (or 960)
 Edith of Wilton, English princess and nun (approximate date)
 Fujiwara no Michikane, Japanese nobleman (d. 995)
 Kou Zhun, Chinese Grand chancellor (approximate date)
 Mahendradatta, queen of Bali (Indonesia) (d. 1011)
 Pietro II Orseolo, Doge of Venice (d. 1009)
 Ramiro III, king of León (Spain) (d. 985)
 Sigmundur Brestisson, Viking chieftain (d. 1005)

Deaths 
 July 17 – Du, empress dowager of the Song dynasty
 August 12 – Li Jing, emperor of Southern Tang (b. 916)
 September 19 – Helena Lekapene, Byzantine empress 
 October 1 – Artald, archbishop of Reims
 October 15 – Abd al-Rahman III, caliph of Córdoba
 Abd al-Malik I, Samanid emir (b. 944)
 Abu'l-Qasim Unujur ibn al-Ikhshid, Ikhshidid ruler
 Adarnase V, prince of Tao-Klarjeti (Georgia)
 Atto of Vercelli, Lombard bishop (b. 885)
 Ava of Cerdanya, countess regent of Cerdanya and Besalú
 Butuga II, ruler of the Western Ganga Dynasty (India)
 Fujiwara no Masatada, Japanese poet
 Haakon the Good, king of Norway
 Landulf II of Benevento (the Red), Lombard prince
 Li Tao, Chinese chancellor (approximate date)
 Minamoto no Tsunemoto, Japanese samurai (b. 894)
 Raymond II of Rouergue, Frankish nobleman (approximate date)
 William II, Marquess of Montferrat, Frankish nobleman (approximate date)

References